Desktop publishing (DTP) is the creation of documents using page layout software on a personal ("desktop") computer. It was first used almost exclusively for print publications, but now it also assists in the creation of various forms of online content. Desktop publishing software can generate layouts and produce typographic-quality text and images comparable to traditional typography and printing. Desktop publishing is also the main reference for digital typography. This technology allows individuals, businesses, and other organizations to self-publish a wide variety of content, from menus to magazines to books, without the expense of commercial printing.

Desktop publishing often requires the use of a personal computer and WYSIWYG page layout software to create documents for either large-scale publishing or small-scale local multifunction peripheral output and distribution - although non-WYSIWYG systems such as TeX and LaTeX are also used, especially in scientific publishing. Desktop publishing methods provide more control over design, layout, and typography than word processing. However, word processing software has evolved to include most, if not all, capabilities previously available only with professional printing or desktop publishing.

The same DTP skills and software used for common paper and book publishing are sometimes used to create graphics for point of sale displays, presentations, infographics, brochures, business cards, promotional items, trade show exhibits, retail package designs and outdoor signs.

History 

Desktop publishing was first developed at Xerox PARC in the 1970s. A contradictory claim states that desktop publishing began in 1983 with a program developed by James Davise at a community newspaper in Philadelphia. The program Type Processor One ran on a PC using a graphics card for a WYSIWYG display and was offered commercially by Best info in 1984. Desktop typesetting with only limited page makeup facilities had arrived in 1978–1979 with the introduction of TeX, and was extended in 1985 with the introduction of LaTeX. 

The desktop publishing market took off in 1985 with the introduction in January of the Apple LaserWriter printer. This momentum was kept up by with the addition of PageMaker software from Aldus, which rapidly became the standard software application for desktop publishing. With its advanced layout features, PageMaker immediately relegated word processors like Microsoft Word to the composition and editing of purely textual documents. The term "desktop publishing" is attributed to Aldus founder Paul Brainerd, who sought a marketing catchphrase to describe the small size and relative affordability of this suite of products, in contrast to the expensive commercial phototypesetting equipment of the day.

Before the advent of desktop publishing, the only option available to most people for producing typed documents (as opposed to handwritten documents) was a typewriter, which offered only a handful of typefaces (usually fixed-width) and one or two font sizes. Indeed, one popular desktop publishing book was titled The Mac is Not a Typewriter, and it had to actually explain how a Mac could do so much more than a typewriter. The ability to create WYSIWYG page layouts on screen and then print pages containing text and graphical elements at crisp 300 dpi resolution was revolutionary for both the typesetting industry and the personal computer industry at the time; newspapers and other print publications made the move to DTP-based programs from older layout systems such as Atex and other programs in the early 1980s.

Desktop publishing was still in its embryonic stage in the early 1980s. Users of the PageMaker-LaserWriter-Macintosh 512K system endured frequent software crashes, cramped display on the Mac's tiny 512 x 342 1-bit monochrome screen, the inability to control letter-spacing, kerning, and other typographic features, and the discrepancies between screen display and printed output. However, it was a revolutionary combination at the time, and was received with considerable acclaim.

Behind-the-scenes, technologies developed by Adobe Systems set the foundation for professional desktop publishing applications. The LaserWriter and LaserWriter Plus printers included high quality, scalable Adobe PostScript fonts built into their ROM memory. The LaserWriter's PostScript capability allowed publication designers to proof files on a local printer, then print the same file at DTP service bureaus using optical resolution 600+ ppi PostScript printers such as those from Linotronic. 

Later, the Macintosh II was released, which was considerably more suitable for desktop publishing due to its greater expandability, support for large color multi-monitor displays, and its SCSI storage interface (which allowed fast high-capacity hard drives to be attached to the system). Macintosh-based systems continued to dominate the market into 1986, when the GEM-based Ventura Publisher was introduced for MS-DOS computers. PageMaker's pasteboard metaphor closely simulated the process of creating layouts manually, but Ventura Publisher automated the layout process through its use of tags and style sheets and automatically generated indices and other body matter. This made it particularly suitable for the creation of manuals and other long-format documents.

Desktop publishing moved into the home market in 1986 with Professional Page for the Amiga, Publishing Partner (now PageStream) for the Atari ST, GST's Timeworks Publisher on the PC and Atari ST, and Calamus for the Atari TT030. Software was published even for 8-bit computers like the Apple II and Commodore 64: Home Publisher, The Newsroom, and geoPublish. During its early years, desktop publishing acquired a bad reputation as a result of untrained users who created poorly organized, unprofessional-looking "ransom note effect" layouts; similar criticism was leveled again against early World Wide Web publishers a decade later. However, some desktop publishers who mastered the programs were able to achieve highly professional results. Desktop publishing skills were considered of primary importance in career advancement in the 1980s, but increased accessibility to more user-friendly DTP software has made DTP a secondary skill to art direction, graphic design, multimedia development, marketing communications, and administrative careers. DTP skill levels range from what may be learned in a couple of hours (e.g., learning how to put clip art in a word processor), to what's typically required in a college education. The discipline of DTP skills range from technical skills such as prepress production and programming, to creative skills such as communication design and graphic image development.

, Apple computers remain dominant in publishing, even as the most popular software has changed from QuarkXPress – an estimated 95% market share in the 1990s — to Adobe InDesign. As an Ars Technica writer puts: "I've heard about Windows-based publishing environments, but I've never actually seen one in my 20+ years in design and publishing".

Terminology 

There are two types of pages in desktop publishing: digital pages and virtual paper pages to be printed on physical paper pages. All computerized documents are technically digital, which are limited in size only by computer memory or computer data storage space. Virtual paper pages will ultimately be printed, and will therefore require paper parameters coinciding with standard physical paper sizes such as A4, letterpaper and legalpaper. Alternatively, the virtual paper page may require a custom size for later trimming. Some desktop publishing programs allow custom sizes designated for large format printing used in posters, billboards and trade show displays. A virtual page for printing has a predesignated size of virtual printing material and can be viewed on a monitor in WYSIWYG format. Each page for printing has trim sizes (edge of paper) and a printable area if bleed printing is not possible as is the case with most desktop printers. A web page is an example of a digital page that is not constrained by virtual paper parameters. Most digital pages may be dynamically re-sized, causing either the content to scale in size with the page or the content to re-flow.

Master pages are templates used to automatically copy or link elements and graphic design styles to some or all the pages of a multipage document. Linked elements can be modified without having to change each instance of an element on pages that use the same element. Master pages can also be used to apply graphic design styles to automatic page numbering. Cascading Style Sheets can provide the same global formatting functions for web pages that master pages provide for virtual paper pages. Page layout is the process by which the elements are laid on the page orderly, aesthetically and precisely. Main types of components to be laid out on a page include text, linked images (that can only be modified as an external source), and embedded images (that may be modified with the layout application software). Some embedded images are rendered in the application software, while others can be placed from an external source image file. Text may be keyed into the layout, placed, or – with database publishing applications – linked to an external source of text which allows multiple editors to develop a document at the same time.
Graphic design styles such as color, transparency and filters may also be applied to layout elements. Typography styles may be applied to text automatically with style sheets. Some layout programs include style sheets for images in addition to text. Graphic styles for images may include border shapes, colors, transparency, filters, and a parameter designating the way text flows around the object (also known as "wraparound" or "runaround").

Comparisons

With word processing 

As desktop publishing software still provides extensive features necessary for print publishing, modern word processors now have publishing capabilities beyond those of many older DTP applications, blurring the line between word processing and desktop publishing. 

In the early 1980s, graphical user interface was still in its embryonic stage and DTP software was in a class of its own when compared to the leading word processing applications of the time. Programs such as WordPerfect and WordStar were still mainly text-based and offered little in the way of page layout, other than perhaps margins and line spacing. On the other hand, word processing software was necessary for features like indexing and spell checking – features that are common in many applications today. As computers and operating systems became more powerful, versatile, and user-friendly in the 2010s, vendors have sought to provide users with a single application that can meet almost all their publication needs.

With other digital layout software 

In earlier modern-day usage, DTP usually does not include digital tools such as TeX or troff, though both can easily be used on a modern desktop system, and are standard with many Unix-like operating systems and are readily available for other systems. The key difference between digital typesetting software and DTP software is that DTP software is generally interactive and "What you see [onscreen] is what you get" (WYSIWYG) in design, while other digital typesetting software, such as TeX, LaTeX and other variants, tend to operate in "batch mode", requiring the user to enter the processing program's markup language (e.g. HTML) without immediate visualization of the finished product. This kind of workflow is less user-friendly than WYSIWYG, but more suitable for conference proceedings and scholarly articles as well as corporate newsletters or other applications where consistent, automated layout is important. 

In the 2010s, interactive front-end components of TeX, such as TeXworks and LyX, have produced "what you see is what you mean" (WYSIWYM) hybrids of DTP and batch processing. These hybrids are focused more on the semantics than the traditional DTP. Furthermore, with the advent of TeX editors the line between desktop publishing and markup-based typesetting is becoming increasingly narrow as well; a software which separates itself from the TeX world and develops itself in the direction of WYSIWYG markup-based typesetting is GNU TeXmacs.

On a different note, there is a slight overlap between desktop publishing and what is known as hypermedia publishing (e.g. web design, kiosk, CD-ROM). Many graphical HTML editors such as Microsoft FrontPage and Adobe Dreamweaver use a layout engine similar to that of a DTP program. However, many web designers still prefer to write HTML without the assistance of a WYSIWYG editor, for greater control and ability to fine-tune the appearance and functionality. Another reason that some Web designers write in HTML is that WYSIWYG editors often result in excessive lines of code, leading to code bloat that can make the pages hard to troubleshoot.

With web design 

Desktop publishing produces primarily static print or digital media, the focus of this article. Similar skills, processes, and terminology are used in web design. Digital typography is the specialization of typography for desktop publishing. Web typography addresses typography and the use of fonts on the World Wide Web. Desktop style sheets apply formatting for print, Web Cascading Style Sheets (CSS) provide format control for web display. Web HTML font families map website font usage to the fonts available on the user web browser or display device.

Applications 

A wide variety of DTP applications and websites are available and are listed separately.

File formats 

The design industry standard is PDF. The older EPS format is also used and supported by most applications.

See also 

 Comparison of desktop publishing software
 List of desktop publishing software
 Document processor
 Camera-ready
 Desktop video
 DTP artist
 E-book
 Digital publishing
 Web design
 WYSIWYG

References 

Typography
Publishing
Communication design
 
Typesetting
News design